Bryan Alfredo Cabezas Segura (born 20 March 1997) is an Ecuadorian footballer.

Club career
Born in Quevedo, Ecuador, Cabezas began his professional career with Independiente del Valle. He became known internationally for his great performances against River Plate and Boca Juniors.

In August 2016, Italian club Atalanta announced the signing of Cabezas on a five-year contract.

Panathinaikos (loan)
On 16 July 2017, Cabezas signed a three-year contract with the Greek team Panathinaikos.

On 3 August 2017, Cabezas scored the second goal in the away victory 1–2 against Gabala FK for Europa League 3rd Qualifying Round. Two weeks later, he scored in the home defeat 2–3 against Athletic Bilbao for Europa League play-offs.

On 16 January 2018, only six months after his contract, Cabezas' loan to Panathinaikos was ended early. In his time there, the 20-year-old winger made 14 official performances in all competitions scoring twice in the 2017–18 UEFA Europa League.

Fluminense (loan)

On 25 July 2018, Cabezas signed to Brazilian club Fluminense a loan with an option to buy.

Emelec (loan)
On 13 January 2019, Cabezas joined on loan to Ecuadorian club Club Sport Emelec until 30 June 2020.

International career
Cabezas was named in Ecuador's senior squad for a 2018 FIFA World Cup qualifier against Brazil in September 2016. He made his debut for Ecuador on 22 February 2017 in a match against Honduras.

Career statistics

References

1997 births
Living people
People from Quevedo, Ecuador
Association football midfielders
Ecuadorian footballers
C.S.D. Independiente del Valle footballers
Atalanta B.C. players
Panathinaikos F.C. players
U.S. Avellino 1912 players
C.S. Emelec footballers
Serie A players
Serie B players
Super League Greece players
Ecuadorian expatriate footballers
Expatriate footballers in Italy
Ecuadorian expatriate sportspeople in Italy
Expatriate footballers in Greece
Ecuadorian expatriate sportspeople in Greece
Ecuador international footballers
Ecuador under-20 international footballers